Out There Halloween Mega Tape is a 2022 comedy horror film that was written and directed by Chris LaMartina. It is a sequel to his 2013 film WNUF Halloween Special; in initial promotional materials the film had the early title of WNUF Halloween Sequel.

The film's production was one of several movies impacted by the COVID-19 pandemic. The film premiered in August of 2022 and was released directly to DVD by LaMartina.

Synopsis
The film is set in the 1990s and presents itself as a copy of an episode of a daily talk show, as well as a recording of a live investigation into alien encounters. The first portion shows a Ricky Lake and Jerry Springer-esque talk show led by host Ivy Sparks, who features strange and unusual guests. The second portion is set some time later and also features a now disgraced Sparks, who is part of a live investigation into a farm rumored to be the site of inexplicable phenomena and alien encounters. The film also showcases several faux commercials, similar to the ones seen in the WNUF Halloween Special.

Cast
 Melissa LaMartina as Ivy Sparks
 Ted Geoghegan as Perry Trenchard
 Katie Hidalgo as Hippie Audience Member
 Shawn Jones as Phil
 Mikael Simpson as Audience Member
 Michael Varrati as Mikael V. Aarti

Production
After finishing WNUF Halloween Special LaMantina wanted to create additional spoof commercials and after completing Call Girl of Cthulu, began to consider creating another a spiritual sequel. He started writing the script around 2018 and chose to set it during the 1990s after reflecting on "the cultural evolution of local 80s UHF stations being bought up by big corporate media companies in the 1990s". LaMantina experienced some difficulties trying to replicate the feel of a video shot and recorded during the 1990s, as there had been several technological advances and changes since the 1980s. He began by creating spoof commercials as tests around 2015, before he had fully come up with the movie's concept or script. 

Filming took place during the COVID-19 lockdown, forcing LaMantina to tweak or restyle several elements in order to follow lockdown protocol. Advertisements shot for the commercial segments included one focused around a politician named Dandridge who was running for Senate. LaMantina brought back Dandridge's political advertisement from the first film as "At Halloween, you always have election coverage, so obviously there are political ads, and now we have this [recurring character] Dandridge running for Senate", further noting that if there were a third film he would feature Dandridge running for President of the United States.

Release
Out There Halloween Mega Tape premiered in both on August 20, 2022 in Long Beach, California and Baltimore, Maryland. 

LaMartina decided against releasing the film through any VOD or streaming service, instead choosing to independently sell copies via his website in DVD format. A VHS copy was made available as part of a limited collector's set. LaMantina chose to release the film in this fashion due to two factors: "One was social media’s desire for urgency and the second was piracy." He argued that fans would want to see the film as quickly as possible and that the format also kept the movie from being easily bootlegged.

Reception
Out There Halloween Mega Tape was praised by Dread Central and Nashville Scene, the latter of which commented that the movie was more polished than its predecessor and that it was "structurally innovative and deeply rewatchable".

Awards 

 Best Writing for a Feature Film at the Nightmares Film Festival (2022, won)

References

External links
 

2022 horror films
2022 films
2022 independent films
American comedy horror films
American independent films
Films about television
2020s English-language films
2020s American films